The Cheyne Baronetcy, of Leagart in the parish of Fetlar and North Yell in the County of Zetland, is a title in the Baronetage of the United Kingdom. It was created on 20 July 1908 for the surgeon and bacteriologist Sir Watson Cheyne. As of 2010 the title is held by his great-grandson, the fourth Baronet, who succeeded his father in 2007.

William Watson Cheyne (1920–1970), second son of the second Baronet, was a brigadier in the Queen's Own Highlanders, who married Laurel Audrey Hutchison, daughter of Lt Gen Sir Balfour Hutchison

Cheyne baronets, of Leagarth (1908)
Sir (William) Watson Cheyne, 1st Baronet (1852–1932)
Sir Joseph Lister Cheyne, 2nd Baronet (1888–1957) also known as R. Monroe.
Sir Joseph Lister Watson Cheyne, 3rd Baronet (1914–2007)
Sir Patrick John Lister Cheyne, 4th Baronet (born 1941)

References

Kidd, Charles, Williamson, David (editors). Debrett's Peerage and Baronetage (1990 edition). New York: St Martin's Press, 1990.

Cheyne
Baronets